Old Dominion is an American country music band formed in Nashville. The band consists of Matthew Ramsey (lead vocals, rhythm guitar), Trevor Rosen (rhythm guitar, keyboards), Whit Sellers (drums), Geoff Sprung (bass guitar), and Brad Tursi (lead guitar). Their music is contemporary country with rock instrumentation, and has pop overtones.

The band has released four full-length albums and three EPs. They released their self-titled EP in 2014, followed in the next year by their debut studio album, Meat and Candy on RCA Records Nashville, which includes the singles "Break Up with Him", "Snapback", and "Song for Another Time". Their second album Happy Endings was released in 2017, which includes the singles "No Such Thing as a Broken Heart", "Written in the Sand", and "Hotel Key". The third album Old Dominion was released in 2019, with the singles "Make It Sweet" and "One Man Band" both successful on the chart. The album was followed by Time, Tequila & Therapy, which was released in 2021. 

In addition to their own material, Ramsey, Rosen, and Tursi have written several hit singles for other contemporary country music artists.

Origin
The band members of Old Dominion are lead singer Matthew Ramsey, Trevor Rosen on guitar and keyboard, Whit Sellers on drums, Geoff Sprung on bass, and Brad Tursi on guitar. The band was named Old Dominion in 2007.  "Old Dominion" was chosen because it is a nickname for the state of Virginia; four members of the group have links to Virginia.

Ramsey and Sellers are both originally from the Roanoke Region of Virginia, and played on drumlines for their respective, rival high schools, James River High School and Lord Botetourt High School. Ramsey attended Virginia Commonwealth University and moved to Nashville after graduation to become a songwriter. He was introduced to Rosen in 2003 and formed a songwriting partnership for some years while working as a solo artist. Sellers went to James Madison University in Virginia where he met Sprung and Tursi. Sellers and Sprung also ended up in Nashville where they joined force with Ramsey and formed Old Dominion. Tursi was once a member of the Washington, D.C. rock band Army of Me; he joined Old Dominion in 2012. Rosen is the only band member who did not have a connection to Virginia; he was born and raised in Michigan, and met the other eventual bandmates in Nashville.

Music career
Old Dominion was initially formed to showcase the songs that its individual band members had written. Members of the band have writing credits on many songs recorded by other artists: Brad Tursi has written Luke Bryan's "Light It Up", Cole Swindell's "Remember Boys" and "Up" as well as Tyler Farr's "A Guy Walks Into a Bar" in addition to songs for Kenny Chesney, the Randy Rogers Band, Michael Ray, Josh Turner, Ryan Hurd, and for the ABC musical drama Nashville. Matthew Ramsey co-wrote "Chainsaw" for The Band Perry, Trevor Rosen co-wrote Kelsea Ballerini's "I Hate Love Songs", Blake Shelton's "Sangria", William Michael Morgan's "I Met A Girl", Chris Young's "Neon" and The Band Perry's "Better Dig Two", Two songs written for the band by Ramsey and Rosen, "Wake Up Lovin' You" and "Say You Do", were covered by Craig Morgan and Dierks Bentley respectively and became hits. The success of these songs led to the band self-releasing the extended play It Was Always Yours in 2012.

Their song "Dirt on a Road" was their first song as a band that received significant airplay, and their single "Shut Me Up" further gained them some attention. The band opened for Alabama, Jake Owen and Chase Rice.

2014–2016: Old Dominion EP,  Meat and Candy 
On October 7, 2014, they released their self-titled EP, produced by Shane McAnally. The EP debuted on the Top Country Albums chart at No. 33 with 1,000 copies sold. The lead single from the EP was "Shut Me Up", the music video features American country music singer and songwriter Whitney Duncan. A song from the EP "Break Up with Him" first received exposure on the satellite Sirius XM Radio's "The Highway" channel in late 2014 which boosted its popularity, and the song was then released as the second single to radio on January 20, 2015.

They signed a record deal with RCA Nashville in late February 2015. The band also opened for Kenny Chesney in his Big Revival Tour. In September, they announced that their debut studio album, titled Meat and Candy, would be released on November 6, 2015. Shortly before the album's release, "Break Up with Him" reached No. 1 on Country Airplay. The album's second single, "Snapback" released to country radio on January 11, 2016. It reached at number 2 on the Country Airplay in June 2016. The album's third single, "Song for Another Time" released to country radio on June 20, 2016.

2017–present: Happy Endings, Old Dominion and Time, Tequila & Therapy
On March 10, 2017, Old Dominion released "No Such Thing as a Broken Heart", the lead single to their second RCA album, which went to number one on the Country Airplay Charts. The album's name, Happy Endings, was announced in June, and the album was released on August 25, 2017. "Written in the Sand" was the album's second single, and "Hotel Key" its third.

The band released "Make It Sweet" in November 2018. Make It Sweet is also the name of the corresponding tour, the band's first as a headliner. Acts which joined them on this tour included Morgan Evans, Jordan Davis, and Mitchell Tenpenny. Both "Make It Sweet" and "One Man Band" appear on the band's third album, Old Dominion, released in October 2019, with the latter becoming their highest-peaking Billboard Hot 100 hit to date. However, the album's third single "Some People Do" became their first single since their commercial breakthrough to fail to chart the Billboard Hot 100, as well as their first single to peak outside the top twenty of Billboard's Country Airplay chart.

The fourth album, Time, Tequila & Therapy, was released on October 8, 2021. It was led off by the single "I Was on a Boat That Day". For the second single, the band switched to Arista Nashville which is also an imprint of Sony Nashville.

Discography

Meat and Candy (2015)
Happy Endings (2017)
Old Dominion (2019)
Time, Tequila & Therapy (2021)

Television appearances

Awards and nominations

References 

2007 establishments in Tennessee
Arista Nashville artists
Country music groups from Tennessee
Country musicians from Virginia
Musical groups established in 2007
Musical groups from Nashville, Tennessee
RCA Records Nashville artists